The twenty-first series of Made in Chelsea, a British structured-reality television programme began airing on 29 March 2021, and concluded after twelve episodes on 14 June. Due to the COVID-19 pandemic, like the previous series it was announced that the cast would be following government guidelines whilst filming this series, with some of the cast moving into country houses located in the Cotswolds and Suffolk where they were quarantined together. The series ended with an episode back in its usual location in Chelsea. 

Ahead of the series it was announced that Miles Nazaire and Julius Cowdrey would be returning to the show, whilst Victoria Baker-Harber returned for the series finale. With the series being filmed away from its usual location, it featured a number of notable absences from the regular cast including Amelia Mist, Freddie Browne, Harry Baron, Melissa Tattam and Zara McDermott. Instead, joining the cast was Eloise St. Clair-Charles, Inga Valentiner and Robbie Mullett, whilst Tom Zanetti also made several appearances.

Cast

Episodes

Ratings
Catch-up service totals were added to the official ratings.

External links

References

2021 British television seasons
Made in Chelsea seasons